Paxton Township is one of the sixteen townships of Ross County, Ohio, United States.  The 2000 census found 2,165 people in the township, 1,153 of whom lived in the unincorporated portions of the township.

Geography
Located in the southwestern corner of the county, it borders the following townships:
Paint Township - north
Twin Township - east
Benton Township, Pike County - southeast
Perry Township, Pike County - southwest
Paint Township, Highland County - west

The village of Bainbridge is located in central Paxton Township.

Name and history
It is the only Paxton Township statewide.

Government
The township is governed by a three-member board of trustees, who are elected in November of odd-numbered years to a four-year term beginning on the following January 1. Two are elected in the year after the presidential election and one is elected in the year before it. There is also an elected township fiscal officer, who serves a four-year term beginning on April 1 of the year after the election, which is held in November of the year before the presidential election. Vacancies in the fiscal officership or on the board of trustees are filled by the remaining trustees.

Education
Bainbridge Elementary School (now a preschool) is in Bainbridge, and the Paint Valley High School falls within the township.

References

External links
County website

Townships in Ross County, Ohio
Townships in Ohio